The 1912 UCI Track Cycling World Championships were the World Championship for track cycling. They took place in Newark, New Jersey, the United States from 30 August to 4 September 1912. Three events for men were contested, two for professionals and one for amateurs.

Medal summary

Medal table

References

Track cycling
UCI Track Cycling World Championships by year
International cycle races hosted by the United States
Sports in Newark, New Jersey
1912 in track cycling
UCI Track